Orange County Roller Derby or OC Roller Derby (OCRD) is a roller derby league based in Huntington Beach, California.  Founded in 2006, the league currently consists of one travel team which competes against teams from other leagues, and one home team.

The league was founded in June 2006 by Heather Shelton, known as Disco Dervish.  Early members included the Orange County District Attorney and, by April 2007, it had hosted three sold-out bouts.  It joined the Women's Flat Track Derby Association (WFTDA) in January 2008, but became the first member to leave the organization, in March 2009.

In May 2011, OCRG began skating on a banked track, in addition to its flat track events.  In June, it competed in the Battle on the Bank tournament.  OCRG was a founding member of the Roller Derby Coalition of Leagues in January 2012.

References

Roller derby leagues established in 2006
Roller derby leagues in California
Sports in Huntington Beach, California
Former Women's Flat Track Derby Association leagues
Roller Derby Coalition of Leagues
2006 establishments in California